Loraine is a town in Mitchell County, Texas, United States. The population was 602 at the 2010 census.

Geography

Loraine is located at  (32.407039, –100.714098).

Demographics

2020 census

As of the 2020 United States census, there were 504 people, 153 households, and 104 families residing in the town.

2000 census
As of the census of 2000, there were 656 people, 250 households, and 160 families residing in the town. The population density was 623.2 people per square mile (241.2/km2). There were 320 housing units at an average density of 304.0 per square mile (117.7/km2). The racial makeup of the town was 61.43% White, 6.25% African American, 1.22% Native American, 27.59% from other races, and 3.51% from two or more races. Hispanic or Latino of any race were 46.04% of the population.

There were 250 households, out of which 28.8% had children under the age of 18 living with them, 46.0% were married couples living together, 13.6% had a female householder with no husband present, and 36.0% were non-families. 33.2% of all households were made up of individuals, and 19.6% had someone living alone who was 65 years of age or older. The average household size was 2.51 and the average family size was 3.26.

In the town, the population was spread out, with 28.0% under the age of 18, 7.5% from 18 to 24, 22.6% from 25 to 44, 19.8% from 45 to 64, and 22.1% who were 65 years of age or older. The median age was 37 years. For every 100 females, there were 84.8 males. For every 100 females age 18 and over, there were 76.1 males.

The median income for a household in the town was $20,852, and the median income for a family was $26,944. Males had a median income of $22,381 versus $14,375 for females. The per capita income for the town was $12,540. About 22.6% of families and 28.7% of the population were below the poverty line, including 38.7% of those under age 18 and 22.5% of those age 65 or over.

Education
The Town of Loraine is served by the Loraine Independent School District.

Notable people

 George H. Mahon, longtime member of the United States House of Representatives, resided in Loraine as a youth
 J. D. Sheffield, a Republican member of the Texas House of Representatives from Coryell County, was born in Loraine in 1960. He is a physician in Gatesville, Texas
 Glenn Smiley, The Reverend and civil rights consultant and leader, was born in Loraine on April 19, 1910

Gallery

References

Towns in Mitchell County, Texas
Towns in Texas